Carl Oliver Hagelin (born 23 August 1988) is a Swedish professional ice hockey player for the Washington Capitals of the National Hockey League (NHL). Hagelin was drafted by the New York Rangers in the sixth round, 168th overall, of the 2007 NHL Entry Draft. Hagelin has won the Stanley Cup as a member of the Pittsburgh Penguins in 2016 and 2017. He also played the most playoff games of any NHL player in the 2010s decade, with 128. He is also very fast, as shown when Hagelin, then a rookie with the Rangers, circled the rink at Ottawa's Scotiabank Place in 13.218 seconds, in contrast to Dylan Larkin skating at a record breaking time of 13.172.

Internationally, Hagelin has won a silver medal with Sweden at the 2014 Winter Olympics.

Playing career

Amateur
Prior to beginning his collegiate career, Hagelin played two seasons for Södertälje SK's team in the J20 SuperElit. During that time, he scored 44 goals and 51 assists, ranking fifth all-time in points and goals scored for Södertälje, as well as fourth in goals per season.

After moving to North America, Hagelin played college hockey for the University of Michigan Wolverines ice hockey team of the Central Collegiate Hockey Association (CCHA). In doing so, he became the first Swedish ice hockey player to ever play for the University. As a junior in 2009–10, Hagelin helped Michigan win the CCHA championship and was named as an Academic All-Big Ten. As a senior in 2010–11, Hagelin won the CCHA Best Defensive Forward Award and was named to the All-CCHA First Team. He also won the CCHA Best Defensive Forward Award and was a finalist for the CCHA Player of the Year Award for the 2010–11 season, in addition to the Inside College Hockey 2010–11 All-America Third Team and the AHCA/Old Time Hockey All-American Ice Hockey Team (second team, west).

Hagelin was then selected in the sixth round, 168th overall, by the New York Rangers at the 2007 NHL Entry Draft. Before playing at Michigan, Hagelin wore the number 26, but when that number was already taken by fellow forward Danny Fardig, Hagelin changed to 12. Hagelin later then chose to wear the number 62 with the Rangers because both 12 and 26 were already taken, so he switched the digits of his old 26, thus wearing 62. Hagelin played in the 2008 World Junior Ice Hockey Championships with Sweden, winning silver.

Professional

New York Rangers

After Michigan lost the 2011 NCAA final game, the Rangers signed Hagelin to a professional contract, whereby he joined the Rangers' then-American Hockey League (AHL) affiliate, the Connecticut Whale, for the 2011 Calder Cup playoffs. He then began the subsequent 2011–12 season playing for the Whale.

Hagelin made his NHL debut against the Washington Capitals on 25 November 2011, registering an assist on a goal by Brian Boyle for his first NHL point. Hagelin then scored his first career NHL goal the next day against goaltender Sergei Bobrovsky of the Philadelphia Flyers.

After Adam Henrique of the New Jersey Devils pulled out of the 2012 NHL All-Star Rookie Showcase due to injury, Hagelin took his spot and was slated to take part in the Fastest Skater challenge during the Skills Competition, ultimately winning the competition after beating Ottawa Senators rookie Colin Greening with the fastest final round time ever recorded, 13.218, later beaten by Jonathan Drouin in 2015. Nevertheless, Hagelin later admitted Rangers teammate Marián Gáborík may be an even faster skater.

On 15 April 2012, Hagelin received a three-game suspension for elbowing Ottawa Senators captain Daniel Alfredsson in the head during New York's loss in Game 2 of the Eastern Conference Quarterfinals.

In the 2014–15 season, Hagelin matched his career-high of 17 goals and added 35 points in 82 games for the Presidents' Trophy-winning Rangers. On 24 April 2015, Hagelin scored the series-clinching goal in overtime of Game 5 of the 2015 Eastern Conference Quarterfinals against the Pittsburgh Penguins.

Anaheim Ducks
On 27 June 2015, Hagelin, slated to become a restricted free agent on 1 July, was traded along with two draft picks to the Anaheim Ducks in exchange for Emerson Etem and a second-round selection in the 2015 NHL Entry Draft, which New York used to pick Ryan Gropp. He was later signed to a four-year contract with the Ducks on 14 August 2015.

Pittsburgh Penguins

In the 2015–16 season, Hagelin struggled with his new club, failing to reproduce his scoring presence from his tenure with the Rangers. With 12 points in 43 games, Hagelin was traded by the Ducks to the Pittsburgh Penguins in exchange for forward David Perron and defenseman Adam Clendening on 16 January 2016. Hagelin then went on to produce 27 points in 37 games, helping spark the Penguins' mid-season turnaround with his speed. He was also a key contributor in the playoffs, scoring 16 points en route to a 2016 Stanley Cup championship. Hagelin again won the Cup in 2017, defeating the Nashville Predators in six games. Although that season was marred by injury and low point production, Hagelin did score the final goal of the playoffs, an empty netter in game six, which sealed the 2–0 victory.

Los Angeles Kings
On 14 November 2018, the Penguins traded Hagelin to the Los Angeles Kings in exchange for Tanner Pearson. Hagelin's time with the Kings was brief and marred by injury, limiting him to just 22 games with the team.

Washington Capitals

On 21 February 2019, the Kings traded Hagelin to the Washington Capitals in exchange for a third-round pick in the 2019 NHL Entry Draft and a conditional sixth-round pick in the 2020 NHL Entry Draft. The Kings also retained 50% of Hagelin's salary as part of the deal.

On 16 June 2019, the Capitals re-signed Hagelin to a four-year, $11 million contract extension with an annual average of $2.75 million.

Hagelin played on the fourth line with Nic Dowd and Garnet Hathaway throughout the 2020–21 NHL season.

Personal life
Hagelin was born in Nykvarn and grew up in Södertälje. Hagelin's older brother Bobbie is a former professional ice hockey player for Södertälje SK in the Swedish Elite League and for Rødovre Mighty Bulls in the Danish AL-Bank Ligaen. Carl is the great-grandson of Boris Hagelin. He married long-time girlfriend Erica Uebel on July 16, 2017. They have two children, a daughter, born in 2018 and a son born in 2020.

Career statistics

Regular season and playoffs

International

Awards and honours

References

External links

 

1988 births
Living people
Anaheim Ducks players
Connecticut Whale (AHL) players
Ice hockey players at the 2014 Winter Olympics
Los Angeles Kings players
Medalists at the 2014 Winter Olympics
Michigan Wolverines men's ice hockey players
New York Rangers players
New York Rangers draft picks
Olympic ice hockey players of Sweden
Olympic medalists in ice hockey
Olympic silver medalists for Sweden
Pittsburgh Penguins players
Södertälje SK players
Stanley Cup champions
Swedish ice hockey left wingers
Washington Capitals players
AHCA Division I men's ice hockey All-Americans
People from Nykvarn Municipality
Sportspeople from Stockholm County